Botswana is an African country made up of different ethnic groups, although  Batswana are the majority of the population. Music is a large part of Botswana culture, and includes popular and folk forms. Botswana church choirs are common nationwide.

Tswana people were the earliest inhabitants of the land that is today known as  Botswana and played its first music. Beginning in the 19th century, Immigrants from the United Kingdom began arriving in large numbers and they called the colony Bechuanaland.

Popular music
Just like other African countries, popular music in Botswana is called "jazz"; however, it has little resemblance to the African-American genre of the same name. There is an initiative to focus on revitalizing the Botswana music industry, instead of relying on foreign releases. Popular music in Botswana still comes from South Africa, the United States, Europe or elsewhere in Africa. Gumba-gumba is a form of modernized Zulu and Tswana music, mixed with traditional jazz.

The music of Botswana is minor in the world music scene. Botswana music is introduced from the British music media and French music media.

Botswana hip hop

Hip hop is a cultural movement, of which music is a part. Hip hop music for the most part is itself composed of two parts: rapping, the delivery of swift, highly rhythmic and lyrical vocals; and DJing and/or producing, the production of instrumentation through sampling, instrumentation, turntablism, or beatboxing, the production of musical sounds through vocalized tones.[135] The national hip hop radio show Strictly Hip Hop, hosted by Draztik and Slim (of the Cashless Society Crew and co-founders of Unreleased Records), has done much for the Botswana hip-hop scene. Dagee Records and Phat Boy are a noted hip-hop record labels. Motswako is also a popular genre.

Folk music
Tswana music is primarily vocal, performed without drums and makes extensive use of string instruments,

particularly the guitar and bow harp. In the absence of drums, a clapping rhythm is used in music with a typical call-and-response

vocal style.

Music, dance styles
 Borankana
 Woso
 Machomane
 Maele
 Iperu
Dihosana
 Chikicha
 Chesa
 Huru
 Mokomoto
 Ndazola
 Phathisi
 Selete
Setapa
 Stibikoko
 Tsutsube

Musicians

 Batladira Radipitse
 Hanif Bhika
 House Embassy
 Culture Spears
 Dikakapa
 George Swabi
 Jonny Kobedi
 Kabelo Mogwe
 Kwataeshele
 Machesa Traditional Troupe
 Matsieng
 Mokorwana
 Poifo le Wonder
 Ratsie Setlhako
 Shirley
 Shumba Ratshega
 Speech Madimabe
 Spider-Man
 Lord T
 NamelessTheBully
 skim same dance
 Andrsn CK 
 Nkatlang "Sepekere" Maikano
 William Last Krn
 Teddy West
 Shaba Stele
 AbTheActivist
 ABITOLA
 Dintleonthetrack
 Pumpa D

Afro-pop/Jazz
This genre has been influenced by South African artists. It found its way into Botswana, where it is popular. In Botswana artists found a way to incorporate South African Jazz, disco music, and Botswana traditional dances and songs to make it more appealing to local and international audience. Afro-pop and Afro-Jazz artists include:
 
 Mr. Tagg
 TIRELO
 Juju Vine
 Lizibo
 Motlha
 Astley Gops
 Lydia Oile
 Thuli
 Samantha Mogwe
 Mpho Sebina
 Katlego Tau
 Unik Attraction
 Tu Unik
 Serwalo Masasa
 Puna Gabasiane
 Donald Botshelo
 Socca Moruakgomo
 Shanti-Lo
 Trevor Mabua
 Kagiso Mangole
 Brando Keabilwe
 Dr Vom
 HAN-C
 Dato seiko
 AMANTLE BROWN
 POIFO MOTLADILE
 Kabelo Tiro
 Ubuntu Band
 Flaque X
 Khoisan
 Vadar
Big band Crew

Kwaito music
This genre originates from the townships of Johannesburg. It has now found its way into Botswana, where it is becoming popular. Odirile Vee Sento's first album was released from Black Money Maker label.
Kwaito artists include : 
 Ghavorr
 Mapetla
 P-Mag
 Skazzo
 KIN Bw
 MMP Family
 SEVEN ELEVEN
 FOCUS Bw
 Odirile Vee Sento
 COLOZA
 LETSO
 Khayas

Kwasa kwasa
An African version of rhumba, popularised in Central Africa, kwasa kwasa has a strong following in Botswana and has produced a number of musicians. It has a slower rhythm than original rhumba (increasing in tempo towards the middle of the song) and is calmer in style than its parent form, Afro-rhumba.

Some artists have attempted to speed up kwasa kwasa and make it more danceable. Artist Vee is one; his style is known as kwaito kwasa, a combination of kwaito music and kwasa kwasa rhythms and guitar. Kwassa kwassa artists include:John Quaine and Gofaone El'Jeff Mfetane. Franco and Afro Musica was popular in Botswana.

 12 Volts
 Alfredo "BBB" Mos and Les Africa Sounds
 Bee Musica
 Biza Mupulu
 Franco and Afro Musica
 Frankata
 El'Jeff and Bango Africa La Musica
 Fresh-Les
 Jeff "IGWE" Matheatau and The Yakho Band
 Kwasa Kwasa Band
 Tumza and The Big Bullets
 Odirile Sabata
 Tyte
 Alberto and Yaah Mussikka

Rock and metal

The development of rock music's popularity in Botswana has been gradual. The music has begun to gain momentum, partly due to mainstream media such as MTV, Channel O and the internet. The native Batswana have demonstrated an appreciation for this genre, and since 2000 many new bands have been formed; most play locally, but a few have toured southern Africa. Rock culture has been recognized with bands uniting in a "Rock Against AIDS" tour. Crackdust was famous Metal band in Botswana.
Notable bands include:

Amok
Crackdust
Disciplinary
Dust "n" Fire
Metal Orizon
No!semakers On Parade
Nosey Road
Overthrust
Remuda
Skeletal Saints
Skinflint
Sms Blues Band
Stane
Stealth
Vitrified
Wraith
Wrust

The National Music Eisteddfod is held annually in Selebi-Phikwe.

Industry and economics 
Radio stations in  Botswana often broadcast popular music. Each music station has a format, or a category of songs to be played; these are generally similar to but not the same as ordinary generic classification. Many radio stations in  Botswana are locally owned media.

An independent music industry (indie music) does exist and artists remain at an indie label for their entire careers. Indie music may be in styles generally similar to mainstream music, but is often inaccessible, unusual, or otherwise unappealing to many people. Indie musicians often release some or all of their songs over the Internet for fans and others to download and listen.

Education 
Music is an important part of education in Botswana, and is a part of most or all school systems in the country. Music education is generally not mandatory in junior schools, and is an elective in later years. High schools generally offer classes in singing, mostly choral, and instrumentation in the form of a large school band.

Large universities account for most of the music degrees in the United States, though there are important small music academies and conservatories. University music departments may sponsor bands ranging from marching bands that are an important part of collegiate sporting events, prominently featuring fight songs, to barbershop groups, glee clubs, jazz ensembles and symphonies, and may additionally sponsor musical outreach programs, such as by bringing foreign performers to the area for concerts.

Holidays and festivals 
Music is an important part of several Botswana holidays, playing a major part in the celebration of Christmas.

Botswana is home to numerous music festivals, which showcase styles ranging from house to jazz to hip hop. Some music festivals are opened in local areas.

References

External links 

 https://botswanaunplugged.com/9787/10-botswana-artists-watch-2018/

See also 
Afrobeat
Burundi

Botswana music